Vismayam may refer to:

 Vismayam (1998 film), a 1998 Malayalam film directed by Raghunath Paleri
 Vismayam (2016 film), a 2016 Malayalam film directed by Chandra Sekhar Yeleti